The 10th Meghalaya Legislative Assembly was constituted after the Meghalaya Legislative Assembly elections in 2018. The term of the assembly is for five years.

Source: News18

References 

 
Meghalaya Legislative Assembly
Meghalaya MLAs 2018–2023
2018 establishments in Meghalaya
Meghalaya